The Samsung Galaxy Tab 4 8.0 is an 8-inch Android-based tablet computer produced and marketed by Samsung Electronics. It belongs to the fourth generation of the Samsung Galaxy Tab series, which also includes a 7-inch and a 10.1-inch model, the Galaxy Tab 4 7.0 and Galaxy Tab 4 10.1. It was announced on 1 April 2014, and released on 1 May 2014 along with the Samsung Galaxy Tab 4 10.1.  Unlike the 7-inch and 10.1 inch tablets, the Galaxy Tab 4 8.0 is only the second iteration of the 8-inch device platform.

Features
The Galaxy Tab 4 8.0 was released with Android 4.4.2 KitKat. Samsung has customized the interface with its TouchWiz UX software. As well as apps from Google, including Google Play, Gmail and YouTube, it has access to Samsung apps such as ChatON, S Suggest, S Voice, S Translator, S Planner, Smart Remote (Peel)(WiFi Version Only), Smart Stay, Multi-Window, Group Play, and All Share Play.

The Galaxy Tab 4 8.0 is available in Wi-Fi-only, 3G & Wi-Fi, and 4G/LTE & WiFi variants. Storage ranges from 16 GB to 32 GB depending on the model, with a microSDXC card slot for expansion. It has an 8-inch WXGA TFT screen with a resolution of 1280×800 pixels. It also features a 1.3 MP front camera without flash and 3.0 MP Fixed Focus rear-facing camera. It also has the ability to record HD videos.

See also
 Samsung Galaxy Tab series
 Samsung Electronics
 Samsung Galaxy Tab 4 7.0
 Samsung Galaxy Tab 4 10.1

References

External links
 Official User Manual

Samsung Galaxy Tab series
Android (operating system) devices
Tablet computers introduced in 2014
Tablet computers